The 2017 Wagner Seahawks football team represented Wagner College in the 2017 NCAA Division I FCS football season as a member of the Northeast Conference (NEC). They were led by third-year head coach Jason Houghtaling and played their home games at Wagner College Stadium. Wagner finished the season 4–7 overall and 2–4 in NEC play to tie for fifth place.

Schedule

Game summaries

Saint Anselm

at Saint Francis

at Columbia

at Western Michigan

Lehigh

at Duquesne

Central Connecticut

Bryant

Robert Morris

at Stony Brook

at Sacred Heart

References

Wagner
Wagner Seahawks football seasons
Wagner Seahawks football